Brian Lanoue (born January 29, 1982) is an American politician who has served in the Connecticut House of Representatives from the 45th district since 2019.

References

1982 births
Living people
Republican Party members of the Connecticut House of Representatives
21st-century American politicians